Aparajito, also known as Aparajito – The Undefeated, is a 2022 Indian Bengali-language biographical film directed and co-written by Anik Dutta. It was produced by Firdausul Hasan and Probal Halder under the banner of Friends Communication and is based on the making of the film Pather Panchali by Satyajit Ray. The film, being shot in black and white, stars Jeetu Kamal in the titular role of Aparajito Ray.

Plot 

Set in the mid-1950s, the film revolves around the journey and hurdles faced by a young filmmaker Aparajito Ray during the making of his first full-length feature film, Pather Podaboli, inspired by the popular Bengali eponymous novel written by Bibhutibhushan Mukhopadhyay. The film has created a sensation in world cinema and won an international award at the Cannes International Film Festival.

Cast 
 Jeetu Kamal as Aparajito Ray alias Apu, the director of the film Pather Podabali 
 Saayoni Ghosh as Bimala Ray, Aparajito's wife 
 Debashish Roy as Subir Mitra, cinematographer of the film Pather Panchali
 Shoaib Kabeer as Chandragupta Kichlu, production designer of the film Pather Panchali
 Ritwick Purkait as Debashis Burman, assistant director of the film Pather Panchali
 Saunak Samanta as Sunil Choudhury, production manager of the film Pather Panchali
 Mirchi Agni as Shibananda Dasgupta, co-founder of the Calcutta Film Society
 Anjana Basu as Baruna, she plays the role of Sarbamangala in the film Pather Panchali 
 Subhrotavo Dutta as a man who plays the role of Harimadhab in the film Pather Panchali 
 Anusha Viswanathan as Devi, she plays the role of Uma in the film Pather Panchali 
 Ayush Mukherjee as Prabir, he plays the role of Manik in the film Pather Panchali
 Haro Kumar Gupta as Nanibala Devi, she plays the role of Indira Thakur in the film Pather Panchali
 Rishav Basu as Surja Shankar, music director of the film Pather Panchali 
 Anashua Majumdar as Surama Devi, Aparajito Ray's mother 
 Paran Bandopadhyay as Biman Ray, the contemporary Chief Minister of West Bengal 
 Barun Chanda as Jawhar Kaul, the contemporary Prime Minister of India

Production 
Shooting began on 12 November 2021. Shooting finished on 15 December 2021. The shooting locations include rural Bolpur and Kolkata.

Research for the film was done by Sreeparna Mitra and Prithwiraj Choudhury. The prosthetics and make up were by Somnath Kundu. The costumes were designed by Suchismita Dasgupta. The hair styling was by Hema Munshi and the production design by Ananda Addhya. The colourist was Soumitra Sarkar. Sound was mixed and mastered by Tirthankar Majumdar. The executive producer was Sounak Banerjee.

Release 
A teaser of the film was launched on 15 April 2022 on the occasion of Poila Boisakh. The trailer was launched on 23 April 2022 on the 30th anniversary of the death of Satyajit Ray.

The film was premiered at the National Museum of Indian Cinema on 2 May 2022 at a special screening organised by the Ministry of Information and Broadcasting on the occasion of 101st anniversary of Ray's birth. It was released in cinemas on 13 May 2022.

Box office
The film earned Rs 15.4 million in its first week. Four days later, the film grossed Rs 18.6 million. On 24 May, the film earned a total of Rs 24.8 million. From the Saturday of second week to the following Saturday, the film earned more Rs 43 Lakhs.

Soundtrack

Reception 
Shyam Benegal appreciated the casting of Jeetu Kamal as Aparajito Ray and the cinematography of the film. Mayank Shekhar of Mid-Day wrote that it was the finest film depicting the making of a film. Sandip Ray praised the film and was emotional to see the portrayal of his father. Taslima Nasrin commented on the film, "Satyajit's name has to be changed to Aparajito, it's a big pain". However, there were allegations that some scenes from the original history had been misrepresented in the film.

Award
 Special Jury Award at 2022 BRICS Film Festival<https://www.siff.com/english/content?aid=c28a0fb5-257f-495f-a0dc-e58a615e2d14>
 Best Director at West Bengal Film Journalists' Association Award for Best Director 2023.
 Best Actor, Best Music Director,   Best Cinematographer and Best Sound Design at Ajanta illora International Film Festival 2023.

 Best Promising Actor, Best Screenplay, Best Make-up, Best Costume , Best Background score, Best Art Director at West Bengal Film Journalists' Association Awards 2023

Invited at Diorama International Film Festival 2022
Best Actor
Best Indian Feature Film
Best Cinematography

Official selection : Toronto International Film Festival (TIFF), 2022

References

External links 
 
2022 films
Indian black-and-white films
Bengali-language Indian films
2020s Bengali-language films
Films directed by Anik Dutta
Films scored by Debojyoti Mishra
Films about filmmaking